Laver Bariu (May 2, 1929 in Përmet – January 26, 2014), was an Albanian folk clarinetist and singer. He led his musical group for over 40 years and had an immense influence in teaching new generations the Përmet's saze music.

References

Citations

Bibliography

1929 births
2014 deaths
People from Përmet
20th-century Albanian male singers
Albanian folk clarinetists
People's Artists of Albania
20th-century Albanian musicians
21st-century Albanian musicians
21st-century Albanian male singers